An Armored group was a command and control headquarters in the United States Army equivalent to the headquarters of an armored division combat command during World War II. Most armored groups served in the European Theater of Operations (ETO). Typically an armored group was attached to each American corps in the European Theater of Operations.

Organization

As organized under the 2 October 1943 table of organization, the armored group consisted of a headquarters and a headquarters company totaling 15 officers, 1 warrant officer, and 81 enlisted men. Without any significant organization changes, the total strength was increased to 17 officers, 1 warrant officer, and 88 enlisted men when the table of organization was updated on 11 November 1944.

 The headquarters consisted of the commander, normally a full colonel, his executive officer, a lieutenant colonel, and the group staff, which consisted of six officers.
 The headquarters company consisted of the following sections:
 Headquarters section – commanded by a captain, with 6 enlisted men.
 Maintenance Section – 1 officer and 8 enlisted men
 Administrative Mess & Supply Section – 15 enlisted men, including the company first sergeant.
 Liaison Section – 9 enlisted men
 Tank Platoon – 1 lieutenant and 9 enlisted men. The tank platoon also included 3 light tanks, normally M5 Stuarts.
 Staff Section – 1 warrant officer, 2 master sergeants, and 30 additional enlisted men.

In addition, the group was authorized 2 attached chaplains, and 2 medical officers with 2 enlisted dental technicians.

World War II

An armored group was intended to supervise independent tank battalions within a corps area. However, these separate tank battalions were normally attached to an infantry division. Therefore, the armored group headquarters did not end up being in the chain of command or administration for the tank battalions which were nominally assigned to it. The corps commander would use the "surplus" group commander and staff as a special staff section for armor. The group's vehicles were used for liaison and to supplement communications with the combat units.

The armored groups were frequently assigned contingency or emergency missions as a task force headquarters. However, the troops required for such missions were only assigned or attached on order, thus rarely was the task force actually activated or employed. Two notable exceptions were the 3rd Armored Group as it assaulted the Siegfried Line in western Germany from 17 to 30 September 1944, and the 17th Armored Group, which was formed of units assigned or attached to the 76th Infantry Division for an attack across the Kyll River in Germany from 4 to 9 March 1945.

In the Pacific Theater of Operations (PTO), the 20th Armored Group played a significant role in provisioning and preparing the amphibious tank and tractor battalions used for the landings on Leyte, Luzon and Okinawa. As in Europe, the staff served as a special staff section to the corps headquarters.

Because the armored group was largely superfluous to the combat mission, the group headquarters was sometimes tasked for other purposes. These included the operation of corps rest centers and rear area defenses, administering provisional military government, and supervising special equipment schools such as mine exploders and flame thrower tanks.

By the fall of 1944, it was acknowledged that American armored divisions lacked sufficient personnel to operate their Combat Command Reserve headquarters as full combat commands, while at the same time the armored groups were underutilized. On 28 October 1944, the headquarters of 3rd Armored Group was split, with a small section of about 30 men attached to the corps staff. The remainder of the group was attached to the 5th Armored Division. By war’s end, this practice had become the norm in the ETO.

Based on experiences in both the European and Pacific theaters, the Army recognized that retention of armored groups was no longer justified and the unit type was eliminated.

Cold War 
On 1 October 1953, the newly formed 19th Armor Group (19th AG), headquartered at Frankfurt, was assigned to V Corps. 19th AG was the size of a large brigade, with three tank battalions and one mechanized infantry battalion stationed from Mannheim to Wildflecken. The 19th AG was replaced by the 4th Armor Group on 1 July 1955 (the 4th AG was approximately the size of the replaced 19th AG); the 4th Armor Group was deactivated in the 1963 Reorganization Objective Army Division reorganization.

Notes

References

Tank units and formations of the United States Army
Groups of the United States Army